A truncated railway station terminus  an original railway station site that is sold for redevelopment and a new, usually smaller station is being constructed back down the line. There are many examples of station buildings and other structures, such as the redundant platforms at Whitby, being sold for redevelopment. The truncation however, was only partial, as one platform still survives in its original location. Many stations have had platforms truncated to accommodate larger concourses, such as London King's Cross and London Liverpool Street This article, however, is about new stations that have been fully truncated and cut short from a former location.

Truncating happens usually when traffic has declined so much that an original station site is no longer required and the land is deemed to have a greater commercial value. Money gained from the sale of a station site can then be reinvested in new facilities.

However, the newly constructed stations can often be sited farther away from a town or city centre. Many old stations have been redeveloped as shopping destinations, with the aim of generating footfall from passengers as they walk to the new platforms. The policy of truncating still continues, and a plan under discussion would relocate Lowestoft some 400 metres to the west and redevelop the land for retail.

References

Railway stations by type